Thomas Chippenham, of Hereford (fl. 1388–1402), was an English politician.

He was a member (MP) of the Parliament of England for Hereford in February 1388 and 1402. He was made Mayor of Hereford for 1391–92 and 1398–1401.

Chippenham had three sons who were all MPs, Henry, Nicholas and Thomas.

References

 

14th-century births
15th-century deaths
English MPs February 1388
English MPs 1402
14th-century English politicians
15th-century English politicians
Mayors of Hereford